TCAM may refer to:
Telecommunications Access Method
Ternary content-addressable memory
Telecommunications Conformity Assessment and Market Surveillance Committee
Traditional, Complementary and Alternative medicine
Transport Chemical Aerosol Model